The Alcohol Dependence Data Questionnaire (SADD) is a treatment evaluation instrument is used to measure an individual's current level of alcohol dependence. The evaluation was created by Raistrick D. S., Dunbar G., and Davidson R. J. in 1983. The evaluation is aimed at adults who have a mild to moderate dependence on alcohol and are seeking help. 

The SADD was designed to be quick, with it being a 15 item questionnaire that may be self administered or administered through a structured interview.  The items on the evaluation ask about the drinking habits of the patient as well as the physical and mental effects of their drinking. Each item is scored on a scale of 0 to 3, giving the evaluation a range of 0 to 45. A score of 1-9 is indicative of a low dependence on alcohol, a score of 10-19 is indicative of a moderate dependence on alcohol, and a score of 20 or greater is indicative of a high dependence on alcohol.

References 

Alcohol abuse screening and assessment tools